Agouti is a type of fur coloration in which each hair displays two or more bands of pigmentation. The overall appearance of agouti fur is usually gray or dull brown, although dull yellow is also possible.

Agouti fur is characterized by an appearance of being composed of hairs of different colors, separate from definite markings (although agouti can appear in combination with other markings, such as spots, stripes or patches). This effect is caused by different portions of each hair being visible, such that different colors of the hair's banding is seen, despite hairs actually having similar coloration. This effect produces a very distinctive, finely "speckled" appearance similar to "salt and pepper" hair, as well as an iridescent effect very similar to shot silk which causes the overall color to appear to shift subtly depending on the angle of the light or when the animal moves.

Agouti fur is the wild type pigmentation for many domesticated mammals. It is a highly recognized characteristic trait of several animals, including many wild canids, wild felids, wild rabbits, and wild rodents such as the namesake agouti.

Canines 

In dogs there are four alleles on the agouti locus with the hierarchy of dominance (epistasis): Ay, aw, at, a. 
 
This means a descendant can only develop a recessive coat pattern in the phenotype if both parents are genetic carriers of the corresponding allele or if one parent inherits an epistatically underlying allele to the offspring. The alleles Ay, at and a are not present in wild wolves that have no domestic dog among their ancestors.

See also
 Agouti, an animal of order Rodentia it was named after
 Agouti gene, an important gene in the determination of coat color

References 

Animal coat colors